Canoas Creek is the name of several streams:

Rivers
California
 Canoas Creek (Fresno County), a stream in Fresno County, California
 Canoas Creek (Santa Clara County), a tributary of the Guadalupe River in Santa Clara County, California